is a 1999 Japanese film directed by Masato Harada.

Cast
 Kōji Yakusho as Hiroshi Kitano
 Tatsuya Nakadai as Hideaki Sasaki
 Kippei Shiina as Akio Katayama
 Jun Fubuki as Kyoko Kitano
 Jinpachi Nezu as Kohei Nakayama
 Mayumi Wakamura as Miho Wada
 Kei Satō as Takashi Hisayama
 Kenichi Endō as Ōnogi
 Hitomi Kuroki as Hiroko Sato
 Tetsurō Tamba (special appearance) as Tajiro Kawakami
 Renji Ishibashi
 Taketoshi Naitō
 Nobuyuki Katsube
 Haruma Miura
 Joe Odagiri
 Yumi Takigawa
 Kenichi Yajima
 Ikuji Nakamura

Awards and nominations
24th Hochi Film Award
 Won: Best Film
 Won: Best Actress - Jun Fubuki
 Won: Best Supporting Actor - Kippei Shiina

23rd Japan Academy Prize
 Won: Best Film Editing
 Nominated: Best Film
 Nominated: Best Director
 Nominated: Best Actor - Kōji Yakusho
 Nominated: Best Supporting Actor - Kippei Shiina
 Nominated: Best Supporting Actress - Mayumi Wakamura
 Nominated: Best Screenplay
 Nominated: Best Cinematography
 Nominated: Best Lighting
 Nominated: Best Music Score
 Nominated: Best Art Direction
 Nominated: Best Sound

54th Mainichi Film Awards
 Won: Best Cinematography
 Won: Best Editing

12th Nikkan Sports Film Award
 Won: Best Supporting Actor - Kippei Shiina

References

External links
 

1999 films
Films directed by Masato Harada
1990s Japanese-language films
1990s Japanese films

ja:金融腐蝕列島#金融腐蝕列島〔呪縛〕